Ronald Hubert Sims (1923–1999) was a British architect and artist. Influential in the Bournemouth area, he is best known for designing the Punshon Memorial Church which earned him the R.I.B.A. bronze medal in 1958. The church was demolished in 2015. In the 1960s, he designed the Broadmead Baptist Church in Bristol - it remains standing and is a fine example of Brutalist architecture.
 
As well as his practical architectural work, he also spent a number of years teaching as a Professor of Architecture in Lincoln, Nebraska; Austin, Texas; and Waterloo, Ontario.

Examples of Sims' architecture

Wallisdown Methodist Church (1954);
Punshon Memorial Methodist Church, Bournemouth (1957), demolished 2015;
Manor Road flats, Boscombe (1961);
Lakeside Restaurant, Poole Park (1961).

References 

1923 births
1999 deaths
University of Texas at Austin faculty
Academic staff of the University of Waterloo
University of Nebraska–Lincoln faculty
British expatriates in the United States
British architects
British expatriates in Canada